The Morris Wetland Management District includes 244 waterfowl production areas, encompassing over  scattered throughout an eight-county area. Like other wetland management districts in the prairie states, the goal of the Morris District is to restore and protect sufficient wetland and grassland habitat to meet the needs of prairie wildlife, particularly breeding waterfowl, as well as provide places for public recreation.

The Morris District covers Big Stone, Chippewa, Lac qui Parle, Pope, Stevens, Swift, Traverse, and Yellow Medicine counties in western Minnesota. The district purchases land from willing sellers, manages scattered waterfowl production areas, and works with private landowners interested in improving their land for wildlife. The district also protects land through purchase of permanent conservation easements from willing landowners to protect wetlands and grasslands throughout the district.

References
District website

National Wildlife Refuges in Minnesota
Protected areas of Big Stone County, Minnesota
Protected areas of Chippewa County, Minnesota
Protected areas of Lac qui Parle County, Minnesota
Protected areas of Pope County, Minnesota
Protected areas of Stevens County, Minnesota
Protected areas of Swift County, Minnesota
Protected areas of Traverse County, Minnesota
Protected areas of Yellow Medicine County, Minnesota
Wetlands of Minnesota
Landforms of Big Stone County, Minnesota
Landforms of Chippewa County, Minnesota
Landforms of Lac qui Parle County, Minnesota
Landforms of Pope County, Minnesota
Landforms of Stevens County, Minnesota
Landforms of Swift County, Minnesota
Landforms of Traverse County, Minnesota
Landforms of Yellow Medicine County, Minnesota